"All Out Life" is a song by American heavy metal band Slipknot, released as an independent single on October 31, 2018, by Roadrunner Records. It was the band's first single in nearly three years, following "Goodbye". It is the final release to feature longtime percussionist and backing vocalist Chris Fehn before his dismissal from the band due to a lawsuit in March the following year.

The single was accompanied by a music video directed by the band's percussionist and backing vocalist Shawn Crahan.  The song was included on the Japanese release of the band's sixth album We Are Not Your Kind (2019).

Composition and lyrics
According to Slipknot frontman Corey Taylor, "All Out Life" was written as "a rallying cry for everyone ... about all of us getting together and saying, 'You know what. Let's not talk about old. Let's not talk about new. Let's talk about what is. Let's talk about what's good, what's real, and get behind that and start embracing things that matter because there's history there and not just because it's the next best thing." Taylor also provided the following additional background to the composition of the song:

Promotion and release
"All Out Life" premiered as the "World Record" on Zane Lowe's Beats 1 radio show on October 31, 2018, after which the song was made available for digital download.

The song was chosen as the theme song for WWE's weekly show NXT on April 4, 2019.

Despite its title being taken from a lyric in the chorus, the song is not on the regular version of We Are Not Your Kind. According to Taylor, this is because it was only intended as a song to let Slipknot's fans know that they are still around, and he thought the lyric "would just be a cool crowd chant". "All Out Life" does appear on the Japanese version of We Are Not Your Kind.

Style and reception
Andrew Trendell of the NME described "All Out Life" as "thrash-heavy". Nick Ruskell commented that "There's an intensity that outstrips pretty much anything from [the band's] last three records, with a streak of venom running through it that could have been vomited forth from Iowa." Scott Munro of Metal Hammer dubbed the single "ferocious" and "incredible".

The track was nominated for a Kerrang! Award for Best Song.

Track listing

Music video
The music video for "All Out Life" was debuted alongside the single's release on October 31 2018, to commemorate a Halloween celebration by the band. The video was directed by the band's co-founder, percussionist and music video director, Shawn "Clown" Crahan. 

The video starts off with a crowd of people standing up on a prison bus, wearing white clothing, symbolic with angels contrasted by them all wearing the same creepy facemasks, akin to that of demons. The crowd of people start to make intense movements  before running off the bus in time with when Corey Taylor's vocals hit. The crowd runs into a warehouse where they meet several black-hooded figures and bow down to them, as if being instructed. They all stand up and raise their hands in unison as the song's bridge hits. The black-hooded figures then spray blood down at the cult from a higher level, covering all of them in blood that is akin to a satanism ritual. As the song ends, the leader of the cult approaches the bus with the rest following in tow, before igniting the bus up in flames by way of a lighter being dropped into gasoline.

Kerrang! writer Nick Ruskell noted that the video does not feature any of the band members, and described that it depicts "hooded-up figures being carted off to prison to be sprayed in gore like something from The Human Centipede 3".

As of July 2022, the song has 80 million views on YouTube.

Charts

Weekly charts

Year-end charts

References

External links

2018 songs
2018 singles
Slipknot (band) songs
Roadrunner Records singles
Songs written by Corey Taylor
Songs written by Jim Root
Songs written by Shawn Crahan
Thrash metal songs